Elections to Blackburn with Darwen Borough Council were held in 2006 on 4 May - the same day as other local elections in the UK.

Election result

|-
!colspan=2|Parties
!Seats
!Previous
!NetGain/Loss
|-
| 
|33||34||-2
|-
| 
|15||17||-2
|-
| 
|13||11||+2
|-
| 
|2||?||?
|-
|
|align=left|Independent
|1||?||?
|-
!colspan=2|Total!!64!!64
|}

Source:

Ward Results

Audley

Bastwell

Beardwood with Lammack

Corporation Park

East Rural

Ewood

Fernhurst

Higher Croft

Little Harwood

Livesey with Pleasington

Marsh House

Meadowhead

Mill Hill

Queen's Park

Roe Lee

Shadsworth with Whitebirk

Shear Brow

Sudell

Sunnyhurst

Wensley Fold

Whitehall

Wards

Corporation Park

 
 
 

2006 English local elections
2006
2000s in Lancashire